KXYL-FM 102.3 FM is a radio station licensed to Coleman, Texas.  The station broadcasts a News-Talk format and is owned by Tackett-Boazman Broadcasting LP.

References

External links
KXYL-FM's official website

XYL-FM
News and talk radio stations in the United States